Derrick Delmore (born December 12, 1978) is an American figure skater. He is the 1998 World Junior champion, the 2000 Nebelhorn Trophy silver medalist, 2000 Karl Schäfer Memorial bronze medalist, and 1999 U.S. National Collegiate champion.

Personal life 
Derrick Delmore was born on December 12, 1978 at Andrews Air Force Base in Maryland. In 1995, he was awarded the Paderewski medal for a decade of playing classical piano at the national level. He attended Stanford University, graduating in June 2000 with a double major in communications and psychology. Derrick is married to San Francisco-based physician Dr. Kenneth Leong.

Career 
Delmore started skating when he was eight years old. He competed in novice pair skating with Alix Clymer in the 1990–91 season and with Crystal Kim in the 1995–96 season. Competing in men's singles, he won the pewter medal (fourth place) on the novice level at the 1992 U.S. Championships and on the junior level at the 1995 U.S. Championships.

During the 1997–98 ISU Junior Series, Delmore won silver in Bulgaria and finished sixth in Hungary. In December 1997, he was awarded gold ahead of Russia's Sergei Davydov and China's Li Yunfei at the 1998 World Junior Championships in Saint John, New Brunswick, Canada.

At the 2002 Skate America, Delmore broke one of his blades during a practice session and back-up skates were delivered to him hours before the short program. He went on to finish 8th at the event. A right hip flexor injury began bothering him in early November 2002 after he fell on a quad attempt at the 2002 Skate Canada International. Due to the injury, he withdrew from the 2003 U.S. Championships after placing 12th in the short program.

Delmore appeared as the male lead in a musical production of Cold As Ice at the Gateway Playhouse in 2007 in New York. In 2008, he retired from single skating to compete as a pair skater. He and his partner, Kelcie Lee, placed 5th at the junior level at the Sectional Championship; they did not qualify for the 2009 U.S. Championships.

Delmore works as a skating coach at the East West Ice Palace in California.

Programs

Competitive highlights

Pairs career

Singles career
GP: Grand Prix; JGP: Junior Series (Junior Grand Prix)

References

External links

 
 Personal website

American male pair skaters
American male single skaters
LGBT figure skaters
1978 births
Living people
Stanford University alumni
People from Prince George's County, Maryland
World Junior Figure Skating Championships medalists